Bibi Chini Mosque is an ancient mosque and archaeological site located in Barguna District of Bangladesh. It is located in the Bibi Chini village under Betagi Upazila. This Mughal architecture style mosque was built by an Islamic preacher named Shah Neyamat Ullah.

The mosque has three access points. It is 33 feet tall, 33 feet wide and the walls of the mosque are about 6 feet wide. Shah Neyamat Ullah came to this region with some disciples in 1659 when Shah Shuja was the governor of Bengal and Odisha. Shuja requested him to build this mosque. The village was named after Chini Bibi, daughter of Shah Neyamat Ullah. Since the mosque is located in the village, later it also became known as Bibi Chini Mosque. Ullah died in 1700.

The mosque was first renovated in 1985 by the Betagi Upazila administration. In 1992, the Department of Archaeology took charge of the maintenance and renovation of the mosque and listed it as an archaeological site.

Gallery

See also
 List of archaeological sites in Bangladesh

References

Mosques in Bangladesh
17th-century establishments in British India
Barguna District
Mughal mosques
Archaeological sites in Barguna district